This is the filmography of Fan Bingbing, a Chinese actress, model, television producer and singer.

Film

Television

References 

Fan, Bingbing
Fan, Bingbing